Alamlou River is an endorheic river in northern Iran, that flows into the south end of Lake Urmia.
It should not be confused with the Alamut River, a distinct Iranian river to the east.

References

Rivers of Iran